Transnistria's September 2, 1990, declaration of independence rests upon the  following Four Pillars:
 Self-determination
 Transnistria's separate history from Moldova
 Actual distinctiveness
 Reversal of Molotov-Ribbentrop Pact

Moldova does not agree with the Four Pillars theory and disputes the status of Transnistria.

Explaining the pillars 
 Self-determination is the concept that, in the words of United States president Woodrow Wilson, No people must be forced under a sovereignty under which it does not wish to live. Transnistria argues that since the majority of today's countries were founded on the principle of self-determination, they too have this moral right.
 Transnistria's separate history from Moldova refers to the fact that Transnistria has no historical ties with Moldova and that it was never at any time in its history part of an independent Moldovan state. Traditionally, the Dniester river formed an international border between the two. Transnistria therefore argues that Moldova's claim to Transnistria is not supported by history.
 Actual distinctiveness demonstrates that Transnistria has few things in common with Moldova. The majority (61.2% as of 2005) in Transnistria are Slavs who speak Russian and Ukrainian in contrast to Moldova where most of the population are ethnic Moldovans and speak Moldovan. The two also differ in alphabets, religions, economies, etc.
 Reversal of Molotov-Ribbentrop Pact is the legal argument that the only tie between Moldova and Transnistria was the forced 1940-annexation by the USSR after the outbreak of World War II, but that this annexation was declared null and void by Moldova itself with its 1990 reversal of the legal effects of the Molotov-Ribbentrop Pact. This, argues Transnistria, also voids any claim to territory obtained as a result of the pact as the result of the legal principle of status quo ante bellum.

References

External links 
pridnestrovie.net: The four pillars

Politics of Transnistria
History of Transnistria